Super Duper is a 2019 Indian Tamil-language drama comedy thriller film written and directed by Arun Karthik. The film stars Dhruva, Indhuja Ravichandran and Sha Ra in the lead roles. The film is produced by Shalini Vasan under the production banner Flux Films. The music for the film is composed by Divakara Thiyagarajan and the cinematography is handled by duo Sundar Ram Krishnan and Thalapathy Rathnam. The principal photography of the film commenced in August 2018 as a short schedule. The film was theatrical released on 20 September 2019.

Cast 

 Dhruva as Sathya
 Indhuja as Sherin
 Sha Ra as Mama, Sathya's uncle and Vikram
 Adithya Shivpink as Michael
 Srini as Vedha
 Nagarajan Kannan as Lawrence
 Janaki Suresh as Banu
 Soundariya Nanjundan as Mona
 Saranya Vivek as Chitra
 Akila Murali as Hema
 V. R. Balaji as Kutty
 A. M. Senthamizhan as Neruppu
 Easter Raj as Seenu
 Akshita Merlyn as child Sherin
 Magesh Swami Kannu as Bobby
 Vaishali Balaji as Swetha
 Shivakumar Raju as Shivam
 Pradeep Raj as Babu
 Kavan as Mani
 Sathish Kumar P as Sathish 
 Ramkumar as Sethu
 Guna Babu as Guna
 Santhosh as Arivu
 Gowri Shankar M. as Gowri
 Rolling Sir Abhinayakumar as Abhinayakumar

Reception 
The Times of India gave the film a rating of two-and-a-half out of five stars and wrote that "Super Duper has some flashy visuals but fails in its storytelling". The Hindu Tamil Thisai praised the screenplay of the film. Dinamalar gave the film a rating of two out of five. Maalai Malar praised the cinematography and the music.

References

External links 

 

2010s Tamil-language films
Indian comedy-drama films
2019 comedy-drama films
Indian comedy thriller films
2019 films
2010s comedy thriller films